Bishop Ring may refer to:

Bishop's Ring, a type of atmospheric effect that causes a colored halo around the sun
Bishop Ring (habitat), a theoretical type of ring-shaped space habitat originally proposed in 1997 by Forrest Bishop.